Ralph Harris, Baron Harris of High Cross (10 December 1924 – 19 October 2006) was a British economist. He was head of the Institute of Economic Affairs from 1957 to 1988.

Background
Harris, the son of a tramways inspector, was "one of four children born to working-class parents on a council estate in Tottenham, north-east London". He was educated at Tottenham Grammar School. He read Economics at Queens' College, Cambridge, graduating with a first-class degree. At Cambridge he was influenced by Stanley Dennison, "who introduced him to the works of Friedrich von Hayek".

Career
After working at the Conservative Political Centre at Conservative Central Office, Harris was a lecturer in political economy at St Andrews University from 1949 to 1965. He was an unsuccessful Conservative Party candidate for Kirkcaldy in 1951 and for Edinburgh Central in 1955, and became a leader writer for the Glasgow Herald in 1956.

Harris became general director of the Institute of Economic Affairs (IEA) in 1957. He remained in this post until 1988, when he stepped down to become its chairman and was replaced by Graham Mather. Harris was then a founding president of the IEA from 1990 to his death. The IEA was set up by Antony Fisher and Oliver Smedley in 1955. Friedrich Hayek had suggested that an intellectual counterweight was necessary to combat the prevailing Keynesian consensus "Butskellism" of R. A. Butler and Hugh Gaitskell. Harris, together with editorial director Arthur Seldon, built the IEA into a bastion of free market liberal economics. The IEA developed links with economists such as Friedrich Hayek, Gottfried Haberler, Harry Johnson, Milton Friedman, George Stigler and James Buchanan, and published many pamphlets and papers on public finance issues, such as taxation, pensions, education, health, transport, and exchange rates.

In 1979, during Margaret Thatcher's first few months in power, he was made a life peer as Baron Harris of High Cross, of Tottenham in Greater London. Yet, despite his strong affiliation with Tory free-marketeers, Harris sat on the crossbenches in the House of Lords to show his independence from any political party.

He served on the council of the University of Buckingham from 1980 until 1995. It was founded in 1976 following a call from Harris and Seldon in 1968 for an independent university. Harris was Secretary of the Mont Pelerin Society from 1967, and its president from 1982 to 1984. He was "a moving spirit in the Wincott Foundation and the founding of the Social Affairs Unit". He did not like to be described as a "Thatcherite", but was a founder of the No Turning Back group in 1985. Harris became a Eurosceptic, and was chairman of the Bruges Group from 1989 to 1991. He was a director of Rupert Murdoch's Times Newspapers company from 1988 to 2001, although he read and wrote for The Daily Telegraph. Nonetheless, Harris described Murdoch as the "Saviour of what we used to call Fleet Street".

Harris helped set up a fighting fund so Neil Hamilton could sue the BBC for libel in 1986 and Mohamed Al Fayed for libel in 1999. He was chairman of Civitas from 2000. He also supported the poll tax.

Harris was interviewed about his work at the IEA and the rise of Thatcherism for the 2006 BBC TV documentary series Tory! Tory! Tory!. In August 2006 he told Andy Beckett, who interviewed Harris for his book When the Lights Went Out – Britain in the 1970s, that he voted Labour twice at the two General Elections in 1974 because he was angry at Heath's U-turn of 1972, his inability to stand up to the miners, and because if you voted Labour at least you knew what you were getting.

A pipe smoker, he was a chairman of smokers' rights campaigners, FOREST, and its president in 2003. He was not convinced that passive smoking was dangerous and published and campaigned against the banning of smoking on trains from Brighton to Victoria station in 1995.

Harris died suddenly of an ruptured aortic aneurysm at his home in North London on the morning of 19 October 2006.

Personal life
Harris married Jose Pauline Jeffery in 1949. They had two sons and a daughter. His sons predeceased him, dying in 1979 and 1992. Lady Harris died in 2017.

Bibliography

Own writings 
 Politics without prejudice (1956)
 Hire purchase in a free society (1958; 1959; 1961; with Arthur Seldon and Margot Naylor)
 Choice in Welfare 1965 (1965)
 The Urgency of an Independent University (1968; 1969; with Arthur Seldon)
 Choice in Welfare 1970 (1971) 
 Down with the Poor (1971)
 Not from Benevolence (1977, with Arthur Seldon) 
 Overruled on Welfare (1979) 
 No, Prime Minister! (1994)
 Murder a Cigarette (1998, with Judith Hatton)

Primary sources

References

External links
 Interview with Ralph Harris on PBS
 A Conversation with Harris and Seldon, The Institute of Economic Affairs, 2001 (PDF, 96 pages)
 
 

 

1924 births
2006 deaths
Alumni of Queens' College, Cambridge
English Anglicans
Crossbench life peers
Conservative Party (UK) politicians
Academics of the University of St Andrews
People associated with the University of Buckingham
People educated at Tottenham Grammar School
20th-century  British economists
Member of the Mont Pelerin Society
Life peers created by Elizabeth II